The 1870 Parnell by-election was a by-election held on 12 May 1870 in the  electorate during the 4th New Zealand Parliament.

The by-election was caused by the resignation of the incumbent MP Charles Heaphy on 13 April 1870.

The by-election was won by Reader Wood, who had held the seat from 1861 to 1865. As no other candidates were nominated, he was declared duly elected.

References

Parnell 1870
1870 elections in New Zealand
Politics of the Auckland Region
May 1870 events